Evaň is a municipality and village in Litoměřice District in the Ústí nad Labem Region of the Czech Republic. It has about 300 inhabitants.

Administrative parts
The village of Horka is an administrative part of Evaň.

References

Villages in Litoměřice District